The Charlotte City Council is the legislative body of the City of Charlotte and forms part of a council–manager system of government. The Council is made up of eleven members and the Mayor, all elected to two-year terms in odd-numbered years. Four Council Members are elected at-large with the other seven representing districts. Though elected separately, the Mayor presides over City Council meetings. A Mayor Pro Tem is elected by the members of the City Council to preside when the Mayor is absent, and to assume the office of Mayor in an acting capacity should the Mayor no longer be able to do so.

Members 
Last election: July 2022

Election results

2022

Initially scheduled for 2021, this election was postponed by state legislation in order to "allow municipalities to consider revising their electoral districts based on new population numbers from the 2020 U.S. Census".

2019

2017

2015

2013

See also
Mayor of Charlotte, North Carolina

References

External links
Meet the Charlotte City Council

Organizations based in Charlotte, North Carolina
North Carolina city councils